An airstrike, suspected to have been carried out by the Israeli Air Force, targeted sites in the Damascus Governorate, including a residential building. Five fatalities and fifteen injuries have been reported, with some of the wounded in a serious state.

Background 
Since the outbreak of the Syrian civil war in 2011, many international airstrikes have been carried out. In Syria, there is a large presence of Iranian troops as well as proxies including Hezbollah and foreign militias from Iraq and Afghanistan. The strike took place in the same area where Hezbollah's senior commander, Imad Mughniyeh, was assassinated in 2008.

Attack 
On 18 February, Israel struck targets in Damascus from the Golan Heights. The Kafr Sousa neighborhood was struck near highly guarded Iranian installations. Witnesses and officials said that the strike killed five people. According to the Israelis, the strike hit a warehouse used by Iranian and Hezbollah fighters. Historic buildings near the Damascus Citadel were damaged, which was blamed on the strike. The strike damaged buildings near Umayyad Square, where multiple security installations are located. Other civilian buildings were also damaged. 15 civilians were injured.

Syria says it shot down multiple missiles. A woman was killed in the Marzaa District, possibly due to Syrian anti-aircraft munitions.

According to the Syrian Observatory for Human Rights, 15 people were killed, including at least 2 civilians. It was reported that Colonel Amjad Ali, nicknamed the 'butcher of Damascus', was among the dead. Sources told Reuters that the airstrike targeted an installation where Iranian officials were meeting to advance military programs aimed at developing drone or missile capabilities.

Reactions 
The Russian Foreign Ministry condemned the Israeli attack, considering it a "flagrant violation of international law". The Lebanese Ministry of Foreign Affairs strongly denounced the Israeli strikes in Damascus, expressing their outrage at the destruction and civilian casualties caused. Hamas strongly "condemned the Israeli attack and its targeting of residential neighborhoods in the capital, Damascus". While the Islamic Jihad Movement considered that the bombing of Damascus "reveals Israel's continuous efforts to target Syria and deepen the tragedy of its people who are healing their wounds after the devastating earthquake."

References 

2023 in international relations
Aerial operations and battles involving Israel
Airstrikes during the Syrian civil war
Attacks on buildings and structures in 2023
Attacks on buildings and structures in Syria
Damascus in the Syrian civil war
February 2023 events in Syria
Iran–Israel conflict during the Syrian civil war